This article lists the artists that have participated in Melodifestivalen five times or more, and their victories where applicable.

The person with the most Melodifestivalen entries is songwriter Thomas G:son, who has entered 61 songs between 1999 and 2020. Behind G:son is Bobby Ljunggren with 50 entries, and further back are Ingela "Pling" Forsman (39 songs), Henrik Wikström (34 songs) and Fredrik Kempe with 33 entries.

Bobby Ljunggren and Lasse Holm have the most Melodifestivalen wins, with five each. Åke Gerhard, Fredrik Kempe and Thomas G:son have a total of four victories. Carola Häggkvist, Ingela "Pling" Forsman and Marie Bergman have had three wins each. The person with the most appearances without a victory is Ann-Louise Hanson who entered unsuccessfully thirteen times between 1963 and 2020.

Normal text shows singers, and italics show songwriters. From ESC.info.se

References

Contestants
Lists of Swedish people
Lists of musicians